Josef Straka (born 4 June 1948) is a retired Czech rower. He competed at the 1972 and 1976 Olympics in the double sculls and finished in sixth and tenth place, respectively. He finished fourth and sixths in the same event at the world championships of 1975 and 1977, respectively. His father was also named Josef Straka and was also an Olympic rower.

References

1948 births
Living people
Olympic rowers of Czechoslovakia
Rowers at the 1972 Summer Olympics
Rowers at the 1976 Summer Olympics
Czechoslovak male rowers
Rowers from Prague